Frank Moore Fitzgerald (November 11, 1955 – December 9, 2004) was an American lawyer and politician.

Born in Grand Ledge, Michigan, Fitzgerald graduated from the College of William & Mary and received his law degree from Thomas M. Cooley Law School. He practiced law in Lansing, Michigan and was an assistant prosecuting attorney for Eaton County, Michigan. He served in the Michigan House of Representatives 1986–1998. He was appointed Michigan State Insurance Commissioner and later Commissioner of Michigan Office of Financial and Insurance Services. Fitzgerald died suddenly at LaGuardia Airport in New York City while on a business trip. His great-grandfather was John Wesley Fitzgerald, who also served in the Michigan House of Representatives, and his grandfather was Frank Dwight Fitzgerald, who served as Governor of Michigan, and his father was John Warner Fitzgerald who served on the Michigan Supreme Court.

Fitzgerald's son, John W. Fitzgerald, is a Democratic State Representative for the 83rd House District, which includes portions of the City of Grand Rapids and City of Wyoming.

Notes

1955 births
2004 deaths
People from Grand Ledge, Michigan
College of William & Mary alumni
Western Michigan University Cooley Law School alumni
Michigan lawyers
Republican Party members of the Michigan House of Representatives
20th-century American politicians
State insurance commissioners of the United States